Yongxing Lisu Ethnic Township is an ethnic township in Huaping County, Yunnan, China.

Administrative division 
As of 2016, the township is divided into seven villages: 
 Yongxing
 Xihao
 Anke
 Jidu
 Bashan
 Simu
 Malu

History 
During the Jiaqing period (1796–1820) of the Qing dynasty (1644–1911), there is a street named "Abili". The street was demolished in a peasant uprising in 1893. Later, Guo Yongxing, a local people, founded a new street in the former village of Dagutian. To commemorate him, the street was named "Yongxing Street".

During the early Republic of China, it belonged to the North District. In 1931, it came under the jurisdiction of the 6th District. The Yulu Township was set up in 1937.

After the establishment of the Communist State, in 1950, it belonged to the 5th District. In 1961, it was split into two communes which named "Yongxing People's Commune" and "Huarong People's Commune". It became a district in 1983. In 1988, the Yongxing District was revoked and split into two townships, namely the Yongxing Lisu Ethnic Township and Chuanfang Lisu and Dai Ethnic Township.

Geography 
The township lies at the northwestern of Huaping County, bordering Zhanhe Town of Ninglang Yi Autonomous County to the west, Zhongxin Town and Chuanfang Lisu and Dai Ethnic Township to the south, Paomahe Township and Chanzhanhe Township of Ninglang Yi Autonomous County to the north, and Yanbian County of Sichuan to the east.

Economy 
The principal industries in the area are agriculture, animal husbandry and mineral resources. Significant crops include rice, wheat, corn, and tomato. Commercial crops include tobacco, tea, zanthoxylum, bamboo, walnut, prinsepia utilis, castanea mollissima, and ginger. The region abounds with coal.

Demographics 

As of 2017, the National Bureau of Statistics of China estimates the township's population now to be 12,844.

Tourist attractions 
The Yongxing Waterfall is a popular attraction in the township. It is also known for the Longshan Temple.

References

Bibliography 

Divisions of Huaping County